Frederick C. G. Brand was a member of the Wisconsin State Assembly.

Biography
Brand was born on June 16, 1829 in Westphalia, then in Prussia. He went on to become a church organist.

Political career
Brand was a member of the Assembly in 1883. Additionally, he was the city treasurer of Milwaukee, Wisconsin in 1872 and 1874. He was a Democrat.

References

19th-century organists
Politicians from Detroit
Politicians from Utica, New York
Politicians from Milwaukee
Democratic Party members of the Wisconsin State Assembly
City and town treasurers in the United States
1829 births
Year of death missing
Prussian emigrants to the United States